Lesley is a semi-rural south-eastern suburb and locality of Perth, Western Australia, located in the local government area of the City of Armadale.

The origins of the suburb's name are uncertain; however, it is believed to be named after a Conservator of Forests daughter. The name of the suburb was approved on 3 January 2006.

References

Suburbs of Perth, Western Australia
Suburbs in the City of Armadale